HCL may refer to:

Science and medicine
 Hairy cell leukemia, an uncommon and slowly progressing B cell leukemia
 Harvard Cyclotron Laboratory, from 1961 to 2002, a proton accelerator used for research and development
 Hollow-cathode lamp, a spectral line source used in physics and chemistry
 Hydrochloric acid, a solution of hydrogen chloride in water
 Hydrochloride, the salt of hydrochloric acid and an organic base
 Hydrogen chloride, chemical formula HCl
 Hypomania Checklist, a questionnaire used to screen for hypomania and bipolar spectrum disorders
 HCL color space, a color space model designed to accord with human perception of color

Computing
 Hardware compatibility list
 HashiCorp Configuration Language, a configuration language authored by HashiCorp, used by cloud infrastructure automation tools, such as Terraform.

Organizations
 HCLTech, an IT outsourcing firm based in Noida, India
 HCL Axon, a subsidiary of HCL Technologies
 Hennepin County Library
 Hindustan Cables Limited, an Indian cable manufacturer
 Harvard College Library
 HC Lugano, a Swiss professional ice hockey team based in Lugano
 Horizon Coach Lines, an American bus company

See also
 HCI (disambiguation)